Vusi Kunene  is a South African actor, best known for his role as Jack Mabaso in Generations and its continuation, Generations: The Legacy, Funani Zwide in House of Zwide, Bhekifa in Isibaya(2012-2016),Jefferson Sibeko in Isidingo(2009-2014). He is also known for his way he speaks Zulu(IsiZulu) . He has appeared in 25 films and television shows since 1993. In 2011, he received the Golden Horn Award for Best Actor for the drama Soul City.

Selected filmography

 Waati (1995)
 Cry, the Beloved Country (1995)
 Kini and Adams (1997)
 A Reasonable Man (1999)
 The King Is Alive (2000)
 Final Solution (2001)
 Jacob's Cross (2007-2013) as Chief Paul Lebone
 The First Grader (2010)
 State of Violence (2010)
 Paradise Stop (2011)
 Elelwani (2012)
 Isidingo (2009-2014) as Jefferson Sibeko
 Isibaya (2012-2016)
 A United Kingdom (2016) as Chief Tshekedi Khama
 Generations: The Legacy (2012-2021) as Jack Mabaso
 House of Zwide (2021–present) as Funani Zwide

References

External links

1966 births
Living people
20th-century South African male actors
21st-century South African male actors
South African male film actors
South African male television actors
People from Soweto